Samraong Tong District is a district located in Kampong Speu Province in central Cambodia.

Administration

References 

Districts of Kampong Speu province